Anne-Sophie de Kristoffy (born 29 May 1961) is a French former competitive figure skater. She is a three-time (1978–80) French national champion in ladies' singles.

In May 1984, de Kristoffy became a sports reporter for TF1. In 2006, she was a member of the jury on TF1's Grand Défi de la glace. In January 2008, she was named director of TF1's sports service.

Results

References

 skatabase

1961 births
Living people
French female single skaters